Captain John Barnes Sparks  (31 May 1873 – 29 March 1920) was an English first-class cricketer and Royal Navy officer.

Life
The son of lieutenant colonel John Barnes Sparks of the Bengal Staff Corps, he was born in May 1873 at Morar in British India. Sparks was educated in England at the Britannia Royal Naval College, before entering into the Royal Navy as a sub-lieutenant. He was promoted to the rank of lieutenant in September 1894. 

Sparks served in the Mahdist War, commanding the steam gunboat Sheikh. He was mentioned in dispatches for his role in the Nile Expedition of 1898. In June 1900 he was appointed in command of the tender HMS Columbine, serving on the North America and West Indies Station. The ship visited Bermuda, Saint Lucia and Trinidad in late 1902. He was promoted to the rank of commander in December 1905.

Sparks served in the First World War, during which he was promoted to the rank of captain in December 1914. He was made a CBE in the 1919 New Year Honours for services rendered during the war and was mentioned in dispatches in April 1919. He was invalidated from active service due to esophageal cancer, succumbing to the disease in March 1920. He is buried in Brompton Cemetery, London.

Cricket
Sparks made a single appearance in first-class cricket, captaining the Royal Navy against the British Army cricket team at Lord's in 1913. Batting twice in the match, he was dismissed for 13 runs in the navy first-innings by Francis Wyatt, while in their second-innings he was dismissed for 4 runs by Harold Fawcus. He also acted as wicket-keeper.

Family
Sparks married in 1902 Dorothy Talbot Nicholson, daughter of John Nicholson of Saint John, New Brunswick; she died in 1909. At the time of the marriage he was serving on HMS Columbine.

References

External links

1873 births
1920 deaths
Military personnel of British India
People from Gwalior
Graduates of Britannia Royal Naval College
Royal Navy officers
Royal Navy personnel of the Mahdist War
English cricketers
Royal Navy cricketers
Royal Navy personnel of World War I
Commanders of the Order of the British Empire
Deaths from esophageal cancer
Deaths from cancer in England
British people in colonial India